Fantasilandia is a Chilean amusement park. The park opened in 1978 and is located in a corner of the O'Higgins Park in Santiago, Chile.

On January 28, 1978 the park opened for first time with only 8 attractions, including the "Galaxy" coaster, "Mansion Siniestra", "Ford T" and "Century 2000", among others.
Over the years the park has replaced many of its classic rides with modern rides like "Top Spin", "Xtreme Fall", and "Boomerang".

In late 2007, Fantasilandia opened a new ride to replace the old ride "Splash". Called "Tsunami" (Shoot the Chute) it was built in Chile under licence of Intamin A.G of Switzerland.
With this milestone the park celebrated its 30-year anniversary. The ride "Villa Magica" also opened in the Kids Zone, located next to "Cine Magic 3D" and fast food locations.

In 2008 Fantasilandia opened the second Vekoma SLC in South America. It is called "Raptor" and cost around US$10,000,000.
In 2009 three new rides opened in the Kids Zone area. These were "Rockin' Tug", "Toing & Boing" and "Buggy Jump", all of them made in Italy by Zamperla.

In late 2010 the Wave Swinger (a flying chairs ride) made by Zierer was opened and is called "Volare"
A German built Condor ride was introduced in late 2011. It is called Ikarus.
In December, 2012, Fantasilandia added an Air Race ride, built by Zamperla Rides, celebrating 35 years of the opening of the park
A year later, the S.D.C Galaxy rollercoaster was closed due to an accident and the "Fun Karting" ride was removed. Also a restaurant with kiddie theme was added in front of the Air Race, and the construction for the new Mack Rides Twist 'n' Splash ride begun (which opened the 21st of December of that year)
In December 2014, Fantasilandia started opening the "Moby Dick" ride, manufactured by Wisdom Rides, which opened officially to public in January 2015

Rides
The rides are divided into "thrilling", "gentle" and "child rides":

Thrilling

Raptor (roller coaster) [Built by Vekoma of The Netherlands, opened in 2008]
Boomerang (roller coaster) [Built by Vekoma of The Netherlands, opened in 1996]
Kamikaze (ride) [Built by Fabbri Group of Italy, opened in 1993]
Disk'o [Built by Zamperla of Italy, opened in 2005]
Tagadá [Built by S.D.C of Italy, opened in 1982 and renovated in 2016]
Haunted Castle [Built by a local company, opened in 2003]
X-Treme Fall (Mega Drop 40', free fall ride) [Built by Fabbri Group of Italy, opened in 2002]
Monga (show how a woman transforms herself into a gorila) [Built by a local company]
Top Spin (ride) [Built by Huss Rides of Germany, opened in 2004]
Barco Pirata (Swinging Ship) [Built by S.D.C of Italy, opened in 1982]
Black Hole [Built by a local company, opened in 1994]
Crazy Dance [Built by Fabbri Group of Italy, opened in 1999]
Tsunami (Shoot the Chute ride) [Built by Intamin AG of Switzerland, opened in 2007]
Air race [Built by Zamperla, opened in 2012]
Moby Dick [Built by Wisdom Rides, opened in 2015]
Tren minero [Built by Vekoma of The Netherlands, opened in December 2015]
Spider (Zamperla Discovery Revolution) [Built by Zamperla of Italy, opened in January 2020]

Gentle
Twister [Opened in 2005]
Bongo-Train (train that goes through the park)
Skooter (bumper cars) [Built by Barbieri of Italy]
4D Cinema [Built by Multi-dimensional Studios, opened in 2003]
Ford T
Dragon (powered rollercoaster) [Built by Zamperla of Italy]
Bumping Boats
Wild Mouse roller coaster (first wild mouse coaster in Latinamerica) [Built by Zamperla, opened in 2006]
Haunted House [Built by a Spanish company, opened in 1981]
Rapid River [Built by a local company, opened in 2003] 
Rockin' Tug [Built by Zamperla of Italy, opened in 2009]
Volare (Wave Swinger) [Built by Zierer of Germany, opened in 2010]
The Pirate Revenge [Mack Rides "Twist 'n' Splash" ride, opened in 2014]

Child rides
Mini Splash [Built by Fantasilandia, opened in 2005]
Mini Skooter (mini bumper cars) [Built by Barbieri of Italy]
Carrusel (Merry-go-round)
Super Truck [Built by Zamperla of Italy]
Mini Bongo
Ducks
Fire Chief [Built by Zamperla of Italy, opened in 2006]
Toing & Boing y Buggy Jump (jumpin' star) [Built by Zamperla of Italy, opened in 2009]
Happy Swing [Built by Zamperla of Italy, opened in December, 2016]
Samba Balloon [Built by Zamperla of Italy, opened in December, 2016]

References

External links
Fantasilandia, Official website
FantaCoaster

Amusement parks in Chile
Buildings and structures in Santiago
Tourist attractions in Santiago, Chile
1978 establishments in Chile
Amusement parks opened in 1978